Black Flags: The Rise of ISIS is a 2015 non-fiction book by the American journalist Joby Warrick.  The book traces the rise and spread of militant Islam behind the Islamic State of Iraq and the Levant.  It won the 2016 Pulitzer Prize for General Non-Fiction.

Reception

Critical response
Black Flags has been praised by journalists.  Michiko Kakutani of The New York Times called it a "gripping new book" and wrote, "Mr. Warrick [...] has a gift for constructing narratives with a novelistic energy and detail, and in this volume, he creates the most revealing portrait yet laid out in a book of Abu Musab Al-Zarqawi, the founding father of the organization that would become the Islamic State (also known as ISIS or ISIL)."  He added, "for readers interested in the roots of the Islamic State and the evil genius of its godfather [...] there is no better book to begin with than Black Flags."  Bob Drogin of the Los Angeles Times similarly described it as "invaluable for anyone struggling to understand the gruesome excesses and inexplicable appeal of ISIS," despite noting that it works better as a biography of al-Zarqawi than "explaining the subsequent 'rise of ISIS,' as the title promises."  P. D. Smith of The Guardian said the book "has the narrative drive of a thriller" and observed, "From the mistakes made before and after the invasion of Iraq, to the continuing tragedy of Syria's civil war, Warrick's account is both compelling and authoritative."

Awards
The book received the 2016 Pulitzer Prize for General Non-Fiction.  The Pulitzer citation described the book as "a deeply reported book of remarkable clarity."

Television adaptation 
In 2016, HBO was reported to have started work of adapting the book for TV mini series. It will be produced by Bradley Cooper and Todd Phillips (via their joint production banner Joint Effort), directed by Helmer Tim Van Patten (also directed Game of Thrones and Boardwalk Empire) and television adapted by Gregg Hurwitz. The series is expected to be named "Black Flags".

References

External links
Presentation by Warrick on Black Flags, September 24, 2016

2015 non-fiction books
Books about Islam and society
Non-fiction books about jihadism
Non-fiction books about war
Books about terrorism
Books about Islamic fundamentalism
Books about ISIS
Pulitzer Prize for General Non-Fiction-winning works
Doubleday (publisher) books